Wolf fish, wolf-fish, or wolffish may refer to:

Anarhichadidae, a family of marine fishes
Erythrinidae, a family of freshwater fishes
Hoplias aimara, a species in the family Erythrinidae
Hoplias malabaricus, a species in the family Erythrinidae